Constantine III (Konstantine III Mukhranbatoni) (1696 – 26 October 1756) was a Georgian prince and the head of the Mukhrani branch of the royal Bagrationi dynasty of Kartli. He was Prince (batoni) of Mukhrani and ex officio commander of the Banner of Shida Kartli and Grand Master of the Household (msakhurt-ukhutsesi) at the court of Kartli from 1735 and 1756.

Constantine was a military commander under his suzerains, Georgian kings Teimuraz II and Heraclius II. He served as a governor (mouravi) of Tbilisi. As a measure against the marauding Lesgian raids, he fortified the fortresses of Ksani, Mchadijvari, and Shiosubani. In 1749, he took part in a successful military expedition undertaken by the Georgian kings to defend the Erivan Khanate from the Turkic Tarakama tribe. From 1754 to 1755, he was involved in the defense of Georgia's frontier from the Avar Khanate. He was killed in a clash with the Lesgians in 1756 and interred at the Cathedral of Mtskheta. Since his sons were still in their minority, Constantine's titles and properties passed on to his family member, Simon.

Family 
Constantine was a son of Prince Constantine II of Mukhrani and Princess Nino Amilakhvari. Constantine III married twice. Once with Princess Ketevan (her surname is not known) and secondly Princess Barbare Eristavi of Aragvi. Constantine had four children: 

Princess Ketevan (1744–1808)
Ioane I, Prince of Mukhrani (1755–1801)
Prince David (born 1755)
Princess Tinatin (1756–1846)

References

1696 births
1756 deaths
House of Mukhrani
Generals from Georgia (country)
18th-century people from Georgia (country)